The 14th Annual GLAAD Media Awards (2003) were presented at three separate ceremonies: April 7 in New York ; April 26 in Los Angeles; and May 31 in San Francisco. The awards were presented to honor "fair, accurate and inclusive" representations of gay individuals in the media.

Special Recognition
 Vanguard Award - Eric McCormack
 Davidson/Valentini Award - BD Wong
 Vito Russo Award- Rosie O'Donnell
 Excellence in Media Award - Diane Sawyer
 Golden Gate Award - Stockard Channing
 Stephen F. Kolzak Award - Todd Haynes
 Special Recognition: Christina Aguilera

Awards
Winners are presented in bold.

Film Awards
 Outstanding Film - Wide Release
 Far From Heaven (Focus Features)
 Frida (Miramax Films)
 The Hours (Paramount Pictures)
 The Rules of Attraction (Lions Gate Entertainment)
 Sweet Home Alabama (Touchstone Pictures)
 Outstanding Film - Limited Release
 8 femmes (Focus Features)
 Borstal Boy (Strand Releasing)
 His Secret Life (Strand Releasing)
 Kissing Jessica Stein (Fox Searchlight Pictures)
 Y Tu Mamá También (IFC Films)

Television Awards
 Outstanding Drama Series
 Once and Again (ABC)
 Queer as Folk (Showtime)
 The Shield (FX)
 Six Feet Under (HBO)
 The Wire (HBO)
 Outstanding Comedy Series
 Sex and the City (HBO)
 Will & Grace (NBC)
 Outstanding Individual Episode (in a series without a regular gay character)
 "Guess Who's Coming to Dinner, Honey?" - George Lopez (ABC)
 "My Own Private Rodeo" - King of the Hill (Fox)
 "Pararse" - Resurrection Blvd. (Showtime)
 "Relax!" - Grounded for Life (Fox)
 "Scared Straight" - Crossing Jordan (NBC)
 Outstanding Television Movie or Mini-Series
 The Badge (Starz!)
 Bobbie's Girl (Showtime)
 The Laramie Project (HBO)
 The Matthew Shepard Story (NBC)
 Outstanding Documentary
 Gay Weddings (Bravo)
 Middle School Confessions (HBO)
 Southern Comfort (HBO)
 Trembling Before G-d (New Yorker Films)
 True Life: I'm Coming Out (MTV)
 Outstanding Daily Drama
 All My Children (ABC)
 Daniela (Telemundo)
 Undressed (MTV)
 Outstanding Talk Show
 "Adopted by Gay Parents" - The Rosie O'Donnell Show
 "Gays in Sports" - Donahue (MSNBC)
 "Dolly Parton" - So Graham Norton (BBC America)
 Outstanding TV Journalism
 "Coming Out" - Real Sports with Bryant Gumbel (HBO)
 "Kantaras v. Kantaras" - CourtTV (CourtTV)
 "A Matter of Choice?" - Nightline (ABC)
 "Nick News Special Edition: My Family is Different" - Nick News with Linda Ellerbee (Nickelodeon)
 "Rosie's Story: For the Sake of the Children" - Primetime Thursday (ABC)

Print
 Outstanding Magazine Article
 "About a Boy Who Isn't" by Benoit Denizet-Lewis (The New York Times Magazine)
 "Free and Clear" by Esera Tuaolo with Luke Cyphers (ESPN The Magazine)
 "Indian Gays Step Out" by Kavita Chhibber Narula (Little India [Reading, Pa.])
 "A Killing in Colorado" by Jon Barrett (Teen People)
 "Mormon Family Values" by Katherine Rosman (The Nation)
 Outstanding Magazine Overall Coverage
 AsianWeek
 The Chronicle of Higher Education
 National Catholic Reporter
 Teen People
 TV Guide
 Outstanding Newspaper Article
 "Coming Out: Revelation Alters Daughter's Relationship with Folks" by Martha Irvine (The Associated Press)
 "Dos Madres para un Hogar (Two Mothers in One Household)" by Patricia A. Gonzalez-Portillo, (La Opinión [Los Angeles])
 "Gay Muslims Face a Growing Challenge Reconciling Their Two Identities" by Robert F. Worth (The New York Times)
 "Mauling Death Creates an Activist" by Anna Gorman (Los Angeles Times)
 "Queer and Present Danger" by Ken Picard (Independent [Missoula, Mont.])
 Outstanding Newspaper Columnist
 Margery Eagan (The Boston Herald)
 Thomas Oliphant (The Boston Globe)
 Leonard Pitts, Jr. (The Miami Herald)
 Deb Price (The Detroit News)
 Steve Rothaus (The Miami Herald)
 Outstanding Newspaper Overall Coverage
 Atlanta Journal-Constitution
 Chicago Tribune
 Newsday
 Orlando Sentinel
 USA Today
 Outstanding Comic Book
 The Authority (Wildstorm/DC Comics)
 Green Lantern (DC Comics)
 Murder Mysteries (Dark Horse Comics)
 Strangers in Paradise (Abstract Studio)
 X-Statix (Marvel Comics)

Digital
 Outstanding Digital Journalism Article
 "Fired for Being Gay" by Jennifer Barrett, Newsweek/MSNBC.com
 "The Gay Purge" by Cheryl L. Reed, Salon.com
 "More Than Just Cross-Dressing: Identifying the Transgender Market" by Kipp Cheng, DiversityInc.com
 "One Man's Tale" by Josh Hammer, Newsweek/MSNBC.com
 "Sleeping with the Enemy" by Flore de Préneuf, Salon.com
 Outstanding Digital Journalism Overall Coverage
 CourtTV.com
 Newsweek/MSNBC.com
 Salon.com

Music & Theater
 Outstanding Music Album
 Become You, Indigo Girls (Epic Records)
 Cookie: The Anthropological Mixtape, Meshell Ndegeocello (Maverick Records)
 Crucible, Halford (Sanctuary Records)
 Release, Pet Shop Boys (Sanctuary Records)
 A Wonderful World, k.d. lang and Tony Bennett (Sony Music)
 Outstanding Los Angeles Theater
 The Big Voice: God or Merman?
 A Cold Coming We Had of It
 The Day I Stood Still
 Dementia
 Drama Club
 Outstanding New York Theater: Broadway and Off-Broadway
 Elle
 The Goat, or Who Is Sylvia?
 Kilt
 A Man of No Importance
 Take Me Out
 Outstanding New York Theater: Off-Off-Broadway
 A to B
 Rhapsody in Seth
 Single Wet Female
 Spanked!
 Zanna, Don't!
 Outstanding Washington DC Theater
 Corpus Christi
 Glory Box
 Hedwig and the Angry Inch
 The Laramie Project
 Not As Cute As Picture

References

14th
2003 awards
2003 in LGBT history
Lists of LGBT-related award winners and nominees